Harestua Solar Observatory is a solar observatory near Harestua in the municipality of Lunner, Oppland, Norway.

It was used for solar research purposes from 1954 to 1986, and was subordinated the University of Oslo. From 1987 it has been a dedicated science centre for astronomy education for Norwegian schools and public science events. Since 2008, the Solar Observatory has been run by Tycho Brahe Instituttet AS extending the educational activities to incorporate natural sciences as a whole.

External links
Official site

Harestua
1954 establishments in Norway
Tycho Brahe
Lunner
University of Oslo